Oren Moverman (born July 4, 1966) is an Israeli-American screenwriter, film director, and Emmy Award-winning film producer. He has directed the films The Messenger, Rampart, Time Out of Mind, and The Dinner.

Biography
Oren Moverman was born on July 4, 1966 in Jaffa (Yafo), Israel. He is an Ashkenazi Jew. He grew up in Givatayim. From age 13 to 18, he first lived in the United States. After serving in the Israel Defense Forces, he moved to the United States. He graduated from Brooklyn College in 1992.

Moverman started his career as a screenwriter. He wrote screenplays for films such as Jesus' Son, Face,  I'm Not There, Married Life., as well as the Brian Wilson biopic Love & Mercy

In 2009, Moverman made his directorial feature film debut with The Messenger, starring Ben Foster and Woody Harrelson. The film had its world premiere at the 2009 Sundance Film Festival.

Co-written with Alessandro Camon The Messenger  won the Silver Bear for best screenplay and the Peace Film Award at the Berlin International Film Festival, as well as the Grand Prize and the International Critics Prize at the Deauville Film Festival. It was nominated in the Best Original Screenplay and Best Supporting Actor categories by the Academy of Motion Picture Arts and Sciences.

In 2011, Moverman collaborated with Harrelson again in his second directorial film Rampart. The film had its world premiere at the 2011 Toronto International Film Festival.

In 2014, he directed Time Out of Mind, starring Richard Gere. The film had its world premiere at the 2014 Toronto International Film Festival where it won the Fipresci Prize,an award given by the International Federation of Film Critics. 

In 2017, he directed The Dinner, starring Gere, Steve Coogan, Laura Linney, and Rebecca Hall. The film had its world premiere at the 67th Berlin International Film Festival.

Filmography

Feature films

References

External links

 

1966 births
Living people
People from Jaffa
Israeli Ashkenazi Jews
Brooklyn College alumni
Israeli film directors
Israeli male screenwriters
Israeli film producers
Film directors from New York City
Writers from New York City
Screenwriters from New York (state)
Film producers from New York (state)
Primetime Emmy Award winners
Silver Bear for Best Screenplay winners